Elections for the London Borough of Merton were held on 22 May 2014 to elect members of Merton London Borough Council in England. This was on the same day as other local elections in England and an election to the European Parliament.

The incumbent minority Labour administration gained eight seats from the Conservatives, returning the council to majority control.

Background 

In May 2013, four Conservative councillors had defected to the UK Independence Party, including Suzanne Evans, who later became a national spokesperson for the party. No by-elections were called as a result of the defections. In the election, all those who sought re-election as UKIP councillors were defeated, including Evans in the Hillside ward.

Results 
Labour gained seats from the Conservatives in the wards of Abbey, Cannon Hill and Lower Morden; this returned the council to majority Labour control from no overall control. Labour won 36 seats (+8) and the Conservatives 20 seats (-7). The Liberal Democrats lost one seat in West Barnes to the Conservatives to finish with just 1 seat, whilst the Merton Park Ward Residents Association maintained its three seats in Merton Park.

|}

Ward Results

Abbey

Cannon Hill

Colliers Wood

Cricket Green

Dundonald

Figge’s Marsh

Graveney

Hillside

Suzanne Evans was elected in 2010 as a Conservative councillor

Lavender Fields

Longthornton

Lower Morden

Merton Park

Pollards Hill

Ravensbury

Raynes Park

St Helier

Trinity

Village

West Barnes

Wimbledon Park

By-elections

The by-election was triggered by the death of Cllr. Maxi Martin of the Labour Party.

The by-election was triggered by the resignation of Cllr. Imran Uddin of the Labour Party.

References

Merton
2014